The following Confederate States Army units and commanders fought in the Battle of Opequon on September 19, 1864. The Union order of battle is listed separately. The battle was fought on September 19, 1864 near Winchester, Virginia, and Opequon Creek. The battle is also known as the Third Battle of Winchester and the Battle of Opequon Creek.

Abbreviations used

Military rank
 LTG = Lieutenant General
 MG = Major General
 BG = Brigadier General
 Col = Colonel
 Ltc = Lieutenant Colonel
 Maj = Major
 Cpt = Captain
 Lt = Lieutenant

Other
 w = wounded
 mw = mortally wounded
 k = killed
 c = captured

Army of the Valley District
LTG Jubal Early
Staff:
Adjutant general: Ltc Alexander Pendleton

Size as of September 10, 1864 = 15,514 men.
 Infantry -   10,116
 Cavalry -4,585
 Artillery -813

Breckinridge's Corps
MG John C. Breckinridge

Staff:
Chief of Artillery: Ltc John Floyd King

Cavalry Corps
MG Fitzhugh Lee (w)

Notes

Footnotes

Citations

References

 
 

American Civil War orders of battle